Tim André Nilsen (born 7 October 1992) is a Norwegian footballer who plays as a striker. He has previously played for Nest-Sotra, Sogndal, Mjøndalen, Fredrikstad, Ljungskile, FC Khimki, Fana and Derry City.

Career
Nilsen was born in Bergen and he started his career with Fyllingen in 2011.

Nilsen joined Sogndal in 2014. He made his debut for Sogndal in a 3-0 defeat against Stabæk.

Nilsen joined Mjøndalen in 2015.

On 13 February 2017, he signed a 2.5-year contract with the Russian club FC Khimki.

Nilsen signed for League of Ireland Premier Division side Derry City on 24 January 2020. He left the club on the 1st July 2020 after making 4 appearances. In 2021 he began playing for Lysekloster.

Career statistics

Club

References

External links
FFK forsterker med Mjøndalen-spiss, framtidinord.no, 23 July 2015
 
 

1992 births
Living people
Footballers from Bergen
Norwegian footballers
Nest-Sotra Fotball players
Sogndal Fotball players
Mjøndalen IF players
Fredrikstad FK players
Norwegian First Division players
Eliteserien players
FC Khimki players
Association football forwards
Derry City F.C. players
League of Ireland players
Norwegian expatriate footballers
Expatriate footballers in Sweden
Norwegian expatriate sportspeople in Sweden
Expatriate footballers in Russia
Norwegian expatriate sportspeople in Russia
Expatriate association footballers in the Republic of Ireland
Norwegian expatriate sportspeople in Ireland